Tlapehuala  is a city and seat of the municipality of Tlapehuala, in the state of Guerrero, south-western Mexico.

In 1535, viceroy Francisco Javier Venegas granted the title to the city.

The city is known for its palm sombreros.

References

External links 

 Interculturalradio, 90.7 FM

Populated places in Guerrero